Les Davidson is an Australian former professional rugby league footballer who played in the 1980s and 1990s. He played for the South Sydney Rabbitohs and Cronulla-Sutherland Sharks and represented at both the State and national levels.

Playing career
Davidson made his first grade début for the South Sydney Rabbitohs in 1985. At the end of the 1986 NSWRL season, he became the first South Sydney player in over a decade to be selected for Australia when he went on the 1986 Kangaroo tour of Great Britain and France. He played five State of Origin matches for New South Wales and was named Man of the match in Game 1, 1987.

Davidson was a member of the New South Wales Origin squad which played Queensland at Veterans Stadium, Long Beach, California on 6 August 1987. Davidson also represented Australia in a number of Test Matches. He is listed on the Australian Players Register as Kangaroo No. 577.

In the Australian off-season of 1988 and 1989, Davidson had two stints in England playing for the Warrington Wolves and Wigan Warriors.

After very nearly joining the Brisbane Broncos, Davidson signed with Cronulla-Sutherland. He made 133 appearances in first grade for the Sharks, adding hardened representative experience to the Cronulla pack during the 1990s, and became a Sharkies favourite.

References

External links
Les Davidson at eraofthebiff.com

Australian rugby league players
Australian expatriate sportspeople in England
Cronulla-Sutherland Sharks players
South Sydney Rabbitohs players
New South Wales Rugby League State of Origin players
Country New South Wales Origin rugby league team players
Warrington Wolves players
Wigan Warriors players
Australia national rugby league team players
Living people
1963 births
Rugby league second-rows
South Sydney Rabbitohs captains